Erik Janiš (born 23 September 1987) is Czech racing driver, currently driving in International Formula Master. To his biggest achievements belongs winning rookie rankings in F3 Euro Series. His manager is Antonín Charouz.

Career

Karting 
Erik Janis started his racing career in 1994 in kart racing (Comer 80 class). He drove this Comer 80 class until 1998 when he left it as quadruple Czech Champion. In 1998 Erik also drove Kadet class which he achieved to win in the next season 1999. That season and the next one (2000 season) he also won prestigious class ICA-J 100 in Czech Championship.

2001 season was very successful for Erik. He achieved another win ICA-J 100 kart class and also Czech Go-Kart Championship — Kadet ICA — Junior 100 class. In European ICA 100 championship he was awarded by Green helmet and in his fourteen years he became the youngest winner of Czech Golden wheel award. In 2002 season he won kart class ICA-J 100 in Czech Championship for the last time. That season was also his first in Czech Touring Car Championship (Ford Fiesta).

In 2003 season Erik change for ADAC BMW Junior Cup. After that experience he returned in go-kart racing (ICC 125 class). In 2004 he achieved fifth place in German Championship and seventh place in European Series. He crowned his successful go-kart career with winning European Championship of ICC 125 class in 2005.

 2005 : Wins the CIK-FIA European ICC Championship, Intercontinental C
 2004 : 7th in the CIK-FIA European ICC Championship, Intercontinental C ; 5th in the German Karting Championship
 2002 : Wins the Czech International Karting Championship, ICA-J 100 class ; Wins the Czech International Championship of circuit racing, Division 4 (under 1,400 cc (youngest winner in the history) ; 26th in the European Championship ICA Junior
 2001 : Wins the Czech International Karting Championship, ICA-J 100 class ; Win the European Go-Kart Championship, Kadet Class (Green helmet ranking) ; Wins the Golden Steering Wheel Award, Karting category (youngest winner in the history)
 2000 : Wins the Czech International Go-Kart Championship, ICA-J 100 class ; 15th in the European Go-Kart Championship, Kadet Class (Green helmet ranking)
 1999 : Wins the Czech Karting Championship, ICA-J 100 class and Win in cadet Class ; Win the Czech Autoclub Award, Karting category
 1998 : Wins the Czech Karting Championship, Comer 80 class and 9th in cadet class
 1997 : Wins the Czech Karting Championship, Comer 80 class
 1996 : Wins the Czech Karting Championship, Comer 80 class
 1995 : Wins the Czech Karting Championship, Comer 80 class
 1994 : 9th in the Czech Karting Championship, Comer 80 class

Touring car and sports cars 
Erik gained first experience in touring cars in 2002 season. In Czech Touring Car Championship — Division 4 up to 1400cc he drove Ford Fiesta, he won and became the youngest champion of Czech Touring Car Championship's history.

In 2006 Erik Janis participated in Ceska Pojistovna, Škoda Octavia Cup for the first time and he stand up to competition. He won two races and finished sixth overall.

Erik continued in Ceska Pojistovna, Škoda Octavia Cup in 2007 season. That year he achieved the title two races before the season's finish.

Furthermore, in 2007 he gained experience on foreign circuits. He started in FIA GT3 European Championship (Lamborghini Gallardo GT3. His best result was a second place at Silverstone with Jaromir Jirik. Erik also drove in International Formula Masters.

Formulas 
In 2007-08, Erik joined A1 Team Czech Republic to take part in the A1 Grand Prix series as main driver.

In 2008, he raced as a Mercedes-Benz factory pilot, in the Formula Three Euroseries with Mücke Motorsport. In his first season in F3 Euro Series he won the rookie rankings.

In 2009 Erik Janis took part in complete testing program of International Formula Master series. However, he missed two opening rounds. Then he came back to series with Czech ISR team. At Hungaroring, Hungary, he achieved his first podium result in IFM (3rd place in Sunday race), then he gained another two third places (Spa and Oschersleben). Erik appeared also in Le Mans Series with Lamborghini Murcielago R-GT car at Spa, Belgium. Together with team mates Peter Kox and Filip Salaquarda they finished second in LMGT1 class. Erik started also in brand new series Lamborghini Super Trofeo with Lamborghini Racing Eastern Europe team.

Career results 

 (1) = Team standings.

References

External links 
 Official web site erikjanis.cz
 Driver Statistics at results.a1gp.com
 Career statistic driverdb.com

1987 births
Czech racing drivers
Living people
A1 Team Czech Republic drivers
Sportspeople from Olomouc
International Formula Master drivers
Formula BMW ADAC drivers
European Le Mans Series drivers
ADAC GT Masters drivers
A1 Grand Prix drivers
ISR Racing drivers
Mücke Motorsport drivers
Charouz Racing System drivers
GT4 European Series drivers